Vladislav Pavlovich Yakovlev (born 1 January 1993) is a Kazakhstani rower, who competed in single sculls at the 2012 and 2016 Olympics.

References

External links
 

Living people
1993 births
People from Temirtau
Olympic rowers of Kazakhstan
Rowers at the 2012 Summer Olympics
Rowers at the 2016 Summer Olympics
Rowers at the 2020 Summer Olympics
Kazakhstani male rowers
Asian Games medalists in rowing
Rowers at the 2010 Asian Games
Rowers at the 2014 Asian Games
Asian Games bronze medalists for Kazakhstan
Medalists at the 2014 Asian Games
Rowers at the 2018 Asian Games
21st-century Kazakhstani people
20th-century Kazakhstani people